Piers Copeland (born 26 November 1998) is a Welsh middle-distance runner specialising in the 1500 metres. He represented Great Britain at the 2021 European Indoor Championships finishing fifth in the final. Earlier, he won a silver medal at the 2019 European U23 Championships.

International competitions

Personal bests
Outdoor
800 metres – 1:46.24 (Gothenburg 2020)
1500 metres – 3:35.32 (Doha 2020)
One mile – 3:56.05 (London 2019)
Indoor
800 metres – 1:47.21 (Glasgow 2020)
1500 metres – 3:38.55 (Manchester 2021)
3000 metres – 7:58.60 (Cardiff 2018)

References

1998 births
Living people
Welsh male middle-distance runners
British male middle-distance runners